These are the twelve men's team squads that competed in the field hockey tournament at the 1996 Summer Olympics in Atlanta, United States.

Pool A

Argentina
Head Coach: Miguel MacCormík

Pablo Moreira (GK, c)
Jorge Querejeta
Edgardo Pailos
Diego Chiodo
Alejandro Doherty
Fernando Moresi
Rodolfo Pérez
Carlos Retegui
Jorge Lombi
Gabriel Minadeo
Fernando Ferrara
Leandro Baccaro
Rodolfo Schmitt
Santiago Capurro
Maximiliano Caldas
Pablo Lombi

Germany
Head Coach: Paul Lissek

Christopher Reitz (GK)
Michael Knauth
Jan-Peter Tewes
Carsten Fischer
Christian Blunck
Stefan Saliger
Björn Emmerling
Patrick Bellenbaum
Sven Meinhardt
Christoph Bechmann
Oliver Domke
Andreas Becker
Michael Green
Klaus Michler
Volker Fried
Christian Mayerhöfer

India
Head Coach: Cedric D'Souza

Subbaiah Anjaparavanda
Harpreet Singh
Mohammed Riaz
Sanjeev Kumar
Baljit Singh Saini
Sabu Varkey
Mukesh Kumar
Rahul Singh
Dhanraj Pillay
Pargat Singh (c)
Baljit Singh Dhillon
Alloysius Edwards
Anil Alexander Aldrin
Gavin Ferreira
Ramandeep Singh
Dilip Tirkey

Pakistan
Head Coach: Jahangir Butt

Mansoor Ahmed (c, GK)
Muhammad Danish Kaleem
Naveed Alam
Muhammad Usman
Muhammad Khalid
Muhammad Shafqat Malik
Muhammad Sarwar
Tahir Zaman
Kamran Ashraf
Muhammad Shahbaz
Shahbaz Ahmed
Khalid Mahmood
Mujahid Ali Rana
Irfan Mahmood
Aleem Raza
Rahim Khan

Spain
Head Coach: Toni Forrellat

Ramón Jufresa (GK)
Óscar Barrena
Joaquim Malgosa
Jordi Arnau
Juantxo García-Mauriño
Jaume Amat
Juan Escarré
Victor Pujol
Ignacio Cobos
Xavier Escudé
Javier Arnau
Ramón Sala
Juan Dinarés
Pol Amat
Pablo Usoz
Antonio González

United States
Head Coach: Jon Clark

Tom Vano
Steve Danielson
Larry Amar
Marq Mellor
Scott Williams
Steve Jennings
Steven van Randwijck
Mark Wentges
John O'Neill
Eelco Wassenaar
Nick Butcher
Ahmed Elmaghraby
Phil Sykes
Otto Steffers
Ben Maruquin
Steve Wagner (GK)

Pool B

Australia
Head Coach: Frank Murray

Mark Hager
Stephen Davies
Baeden Choppy
Lachlan Elmer
Stuart Carruthers
Grant Smith
Damon Diletti (GK)
Lachlan Dreher (GK)
Brendan Garard
Paul Gaudoin
Paul Lewis
Matthew Smith
Jay Stacy
Daniel Sproule
Ken Wark
Michael York

Great Britain
Head Coach: Jonathon Copp

Simon Mason (GK)
David Luckes (GK)
Jon Wyatt
Julian Halls
Soma Singh
Simon Hazlitt
Jason Laslett
Kalbir Takher
Jason Lee
Nick Thompson
Chris Mayer
Phil McGuire
Russell Garcia
John Shaw
Calum Giles
Daniel Hall

South Korea
Head Coach: Jeon Jae-hong

Gu Jin-su (GK)
Sin Seok-gyo
Han Byeong-guk
Yu Myeong-gun
Cho Myung-jun
Jeon Jong-ha
Yu Seung-jin
Park Sin-heung
Kang Keon-wook
Kim Jong-i
Jeong Yong-gyun
Song Seung-tae
Kim Yong-bae
Hong Gyeong-seop
Kim Yeong-gwi
Kim Yoon

Malaysia
Head Coach: Volker Knapp

Mohamed Nasihin Nubil Ibrahim
Maninderjit Singh Magmar
Lailin Abu Hassan
Brian Siva
Lim Chiow Chuan
Charles David
Chairil Anwar Abdul Aziz
Lam Mun Fatt
Shankar Ramu
Nor Saiful Zaini Nasir-ud-Din
Kaliswaran Muniandy
Aphthar Singh Piara
Mirnawan Nawawi
Calvin Fernandez
Kuhan Shanmuganathan
Hamdan Hamzah

Netherlands
Head Coach: Roelant Oltmans

Ronald Jansen (GK)
Bram Lomans
Leo Klein Gebbink
Erik Jazet
Tycho van Meer
Wouter van Pelt
Marc Delissen 
Jacques Brinkman
Maurits Crucq
Stephan Veen
Floris Jan Bovelander
Jeroen Delmee (c)
Guus Vogels (GK)
Teun de Nooijer
Remco van Wijk
Taco van den Honert

South Africa
Head Coach: Gavin Featherstone

Brian Myburgh (GK)
Brad Milne
Shaun Cooke
Craig Jackson
Craig Fulton
Bradley Michalaro
Gregg Clark
Gary Boddington
Alistar Frederdicks
Wayne Graham
Kevin Chree
Charles Teversham
Greg Nicol
Matthew Hallowes
Grant Fulton
Murray Anderson

References

External links

1996